Ivan Nekić (born 24 December 2000) is a Croatian professional footballer who plays as a centre-back for I liga side Sandecja Nowy Sącz.

Career
On 2 June 2022, Nekić signed a two-year deal with Polish I liga side Sandecja Nowy Sącz, with a one-year extension option.

References

External links
 

2000 births
Living people
Sportspeople from Zadar
Association football central defenders
Croatian footballers
Croatia youth international footballers
NK Inter Zaprešić players
Sandecja Nowy Sącz players
Croatian Football League players
First Football League (Croatia) players
I liga players
Croatian expatriate footballers
Expatriate footballers in Poland
Croatian expatriate sportspeople in Poland